A national championship(s) is the top achievement for any sport or contest within a league of a particular nation or nation state. The title is usually awarded by contests, ranking systems, stature, ability, etc. This determines the best team, individual (or other entity) in a particular nation and in a particular field. Often, the use of the term cup or championship is just a choice of words.

Bandy
  List of Finnish bandy champions
  List of Norwegian bandy champions
  List of Russian bandy champions
  List of Swedish bandy champions
  List of United States bandy champions

Basketball
NBA Finals
NCAA Division I men's basketball tournament
NCAA Division I women's basketball tournament
Úrvalsdeild karla
Úrvalsdeild kvenna

Bridge
 North American Bridge Championships

Cross country running
 USA Cross Country Championships
 Foot Locker Cross Country Championships (high school level)

Curling

Men's
 Tim Hortons Brier
 United States Curling Men's Championships
 Bruadar Scottish Men's Championship
 French national men's curling championship
 Russian Men's Curling Championship
 Italian Curling Championship

Women's
 Scotties Tournament of Hearts
 United States Curling Women's Championships
 Columba Cream Scottish Women's Championship
 French national women's curling championship
 Italian Curling Championship

Figure skating

American Football
Super Bowl
College football national championships in NCAA Division I FBS
College Football Playoff
Bowl Championship Series (formerly)
NCAA Division I Football Championship
Black college football national championship
High School Football National Championship
Irish American Football League
Shamrock Bowl

Golf
 The Masters Tournament
 The United States Open Championship
 The Open Championship
 The PGA Championship

Sailing
Intercollegiate Sailing Association National Championships

Rowing
 USRowing National Championships
 Intercollegiate Rowing Association National Championships (college men and lightweight men and women)
 NCAA Division I Rowing Championship (college openweight women)
 British Rowing Championships
 Australian Rowing Championships

Swimming
 United States Swimming National Championships

Tennis

 Australian Open
 French Open
 US Open
 The Championships, Wimbledon

Track and field
 Lithuanian Athletics Championships
 USA Outdoor Track and Field Championships
 Japan Championships in Athletics

Volleyball
NCAA Men's Volleyball Championship

Wrestling (professional)
NWA United National Championship

Sports terminology